Burning bush is described in the Book of Exodus and used as a symbol of various Presbyterian denominations.

The term (also burning-bush and burningbush) may also refer to:

Plant common names
 Bassia scoparia, large annual herb in the family Chenopodiaceae native to Eurasia introduced to many parts of North America
 Combretum paniculatum, a plant native to Africa
 Dictamnus, a herbaceous plant of the family Rutaceae known for its volatile oils native to southern Europe, North Africa, and much of Asia
 Euonymus
 Euonymus alatus, the winged spindle or winged euonymus, a plant native to eastern Asia common as an ornamental and invasive in North America
 Euonymus atropurpureus, the eastern burning bush, a plant native primarily to Midwestern United States
 Euonymus occidentalis, the western burning bush, a plant native to western North America

Other uses

 Burning Bush, Georgia, an unincorporated community
 Burning Bush, Pennsylvania
 The Burning Bush, a theological journal published in Singapore
  The Burning Bush (klezmer band), musical group founded by Lucie Skeaping
 Burning Bush Colony, a former Methodist community in Texas, United States
 Burning Bush (miniseries), a miniseries directed by Agnieszka Holland for HBO Europe
 "Burning Bush", a 1988 song by So
 "Burning Bush", a 2013 song Jesse Jagz from Jagz Nation, Vol.1. Thy Nation Come 
 "Burnin' Bush", a 1976 song by Earth, Wind & Fire from Spirit